The 1892 Virginia Orange and Blue football team represented the University of Virginia as an independent the 1892 college football season. The team was led by first-year coach William C. Spicer. The team posted a 3–2–1 record to claim a Southern championship, though it split two games with co-champion North Carolina. Those games with UNC mark the beginning of the South's Oldest Rivalry.

Schedule

References

Virginia
Virginia Cavaliers football seasons
Virginia Orange and Blue football